The 2017 Naiste Meistriliiga was the 25th season of women's league football in Estonia.

The season was played between 1 April 2017, and 14 October 2017. The defending Champions were Pärnu JK, who successfully defended their title for the seventh year running. It is their 13th league title overall and gave them qualification to the 2018–19 UEFA Women's Champions League.

Current clubs

The following clubs competed in the 2017 Naiste Meistriliiga season:

Format
The 8 teams play each other twice, for a total of 14 matches, with the top four teams qualifying for a championship round and the bottom four teams playing a relegation round.

Regular season

League table

Results

References

External links
Naised Meistriliiiga 2017 jalgpall.ee 
Meistrliiga Women (regular season) Soccerway

Estonia
Estonia
2017 in Estonian football
Naiste Meistriliiga